William Alston (1921–2009) was an American philosopher.

William Alston may also refer to:

William Alston (South Carolina) (1757–1839), South Carolina legislator, slave owner, planter, and horse breeder
William J. Alston (1800–1876), attorney, politician, and planter from Alabama, U.S.
Sir William Alston, 7th Baronet (1722–1801) of the Alston baronets
Sir William Alston, 8th Baronet (1746–1819) of the Alston baronets